The Caledonian orogeny was a mountain-building era recorded in the northern parts of the British Isles, the Scandinavian Mountains, Svalbard, eastern Greenland and parts of north-central Europe. The Caledonian orogeny encompasses events that occurred from the Ordovician to Early Devonian, roughly 490–390 million years ago (Ma). It was caused by the closure of the Iapetus Ocean when the continents and terranes of Laurentia, Baltica and Avalonia collided.

The orogeny is named for Caledonia, the Latin name for Scotland. The term was first used in 1885 by Austrian geologist Eduard Suess for an episode of mountain building in northern Europe that predated the Devonian period. Geologists like Émile Haug and Hans Stille saw the Caledonian event as one of several episodic phases of mountain building that had occurred during Earth's history. Current understanding has it that the Caledonian orogeny encompasses a number of tectonic phases that can laterally be diachronous. The name "Caledonian" can therefore not be used for an absolute period of geological time, it applies only to a series of tectonically related events.

Geodynamic history

The Caledonian orogeny was one of several orogenies that would eventually form the supercontinent Pangaea in the Late Paleozoic era. In the Early Paleozoic the majority of all continental landmasses were united in the paleocontinent of Gondwana, containing the crust of future Africa, South America, southern Eurasia, Australia and Antarctica, which lay centered on the South Pole. Between 650 and 550 million years ago (in the Ediacaran period) the smaller continents of Laurentia (containing the future northeast section of North America), Baltica and Siberia had separated from Gondwana to move northward towards the equator. In the process, the Iapetus Ocean between Gondwana, Baltica and Laurentia closed.

In the Early Ordovician period (about 480 million years ago) the microcontinent (a small fragment of continental lithosphere) Avalonia (now lithosphere that is scattered over the east of New England, the south of Newfoundland, parts of New Brunswick and Nova Scotia, southern Ireland, most of England and Wales, the Low Countries, northern Germany and Silesia) began to separate from the northern margin of Gondwana.

Early phases
Some early phases of deformation and/or metamorphism are recognized in the Scandinavian Caledonides. The first phase that is often included in the Caledonian orogeny is the Finnmarkian phase at 505 million years ago (late Cambrian). Another phase was the Jämtlandian phase at 455 million years ago. These phases are explained by the assumption that the western edge of Baltica collided with an island arc or microcontinent. In a similar way, the eastern edge of Laurentia collided with an island arc during the Taconic orogeny (from 480 to 435 million years ago).

During the Ordovician, the small continent of Avalonia moved independently in a northeastern direction towards Baltica. This motion was accommodated by the subduction of the southeastern Iapetus Ocean (the so-called Tornquist Sea) beneath eastern Avalonia. In the Late Ordovician (about 450 million years ago) continental collision started between Avalonia and Baltica. The Tornquist Sea disappeared in the process, the remaining suture is the Tornquist line, which runs under the North Sea, southern Denmark and northern Germany and Poland.

Scandian/Grampian phase

The main phase of the Caledonian orogeny (from about 425 to 400 million years ago) is called the Scandian phase in Scandinavia and the Grampian phase in the British Isles. It was caused by the collision between Laurentia and Baltica. The Iapetus Ocean first closed in the north, then in the south. Therefore, the collision between Baltica and Laurentia took place a little earlier than that between Avalonia and Laurentia. Continental collision started in the Mid Silurian and mountain building took place in the Early Devonian (from 420–405 million years ago). In North America, the collision between Avalonia and Laurentia is called the Acadian orogeny.

According to some authors, the Caledonian continental collisions involved another microcontinent, Armorica (southern Portugal, most of the north of France and parts of southern Germany and the Czech Republic), even smaller than Avalonia. This microcontinent probably did not form one consistent unit, but was instead a series of fragments, of which the current Armorican and Bohemian Massifs are the most important. The ocean between the combined continental mass of Laurentia, Baltica and Avalonia (called Euramerica, Laurussia or Old Red Continent) and Armorica is called the Rheic Ocean.

The paleogeographic position of the Armorica crustal fragments between the Ordovician and Carboniferous is highly disputed though. There are indications that the Bohemian Massif started moving northward from the Ordovician onward, but many authors place the accretion of the Armorican terranes with the southern margin of Laurussia in the Carboniferous Hercynian orogeny (about 340 million years ago). The Rhenohercynian basin, a back-arc basin, formed at the southern margin of Euramerica just after the Caledonian orogeny. According to these authors, a small rim from Euramerica rifted off when this basin formed. The basin closed when these Caledonian deformed terranes were accreted again to Laurussia during the Hercynian orogeny.

See also
Scandinavian Mountains
Świętokrzyskie Mountains
Geological structure of Great Britain
Central Pangean Mountains
Iapetus Suture
Queen Louise Land
Trans-European Suture Zone

References

Literature
; 2006: European geography in a global context from the Vendian to the end of the Palaeozoic, in:  (eds.): European Lithosphere Dynamics, Geological Society of London Memoirs 32, pp. 83–95.
; 1997: The margins of Avalonia, Geological Magazine 134, pp. 627–636.
; 1998: Timing and kinematics of Caledonian thrusting and extensional collapse, southern Norway: evidence from 40Ar/39Ar thermochronology. Journal of Structural Geology 20, 765-781. 
; 2003: Mountain building in Scotland, .
; 2001: The Variscan collage and orogeny (480–290 Ma) and the tectonic definition of the Armorica microplate: a review, Terra Nova 13, 122–128.
; 2000: The Caledonian Orogeny redefined, Journal of the Geological Society 157, pp. 1149–1154.
; 2002: The Early Palaeozoic break-up of northern Gondwana, new palaeomagnetic and geochronological data from the Saxothuringian Basin, Germany, International Journal of Earth Sciences 91(5), pp. 838–849.
; 2002: Paleozoic evolution of pre-Variscan terranes: From Gondwana to the Variscan collision, Geological Society of America Special Paper 364, pp. 263–280.
; 2004: Earth Geography from 400 to 250 Ma: a palaeomagnetic, faunal and facies review, Journal of the Geological Society of London 161, pp. 555–572.
; 2003: The Tornquist Sea and Baltica–Avalonia docking, Tectonophysics 362, pp. 67– 82.
; 1996: Continental break-up and collision in the Neoproterozoic and Palaeozoic – A tale of Baltica and Laurentia, Earth-Science Reviews 40, p. 229–258.
; 1990: Geological Atlas of Western and Central Europe, Shell Internationale Petroleum Maatschappij BV (2nd ed.), .

External links
Middle Ordovician (Continent Map)
Middle Silurian (Continent Map)
Emplacement timing of the Galway Granite ...
Re-defining the Caledonian
Caledonian in Shetland
Britain's formation

Ordovician orogenies
Silurian orogenies
Devonian orogenies
Orogenies of Europe
Paleozoic Europe
Geology of the United Kingdom
Geology of Norway
Ordovician England
Ordovician Norway
Silurian England
Silurian Norway
Devonian England
Devonian Norway